Valery Ivannikov (born 28 January 1967) is a Russian ice hockey player. He competed in the men's tournament at the 1994 Winter Olympics. Ivannikov was the Soviet goaltender in the infamous Punch-up in Piestany game at the 1987 World Junior Ice Hockey Championships.

References

1967 births
Living people
Soviet ice hockey goaltenders
Russian ice hockey goaltenders
Olympic ice hockey players of Russia
Ice hockey players at the 1994 Winter Olympics
Sportspeople from Chelyabinsk
Traktor Chelyabinsk players
HC CSKA Moscow players
SKA Saint Petersburg players
Metallurg Magnitogorsk players
Yunost Minsk players